Chicoreus strigatus is a species of sea snail, a marine gastropod mollusk in the family Muricidae, the murex snails or rock snails.

Description

Distribution

References

 Sowerby, G.B. II, 1879 Murex. In: Thesaurus conchyliorum or genera of shells, vol. 4, p. 55 p, 24 pls
 Houart, R., 1992. The genus Chicoreus and related genera (Gastropoda: Muricidae) in the Indo-West Pacific. Mémoires du Muséum national d'Histoire naturelle 154(A): 1-188
 Liu, J.Y. [Ruiyu] (ed.). (2008). Checklist of marine biota of China seas. China Science Press. 1267 pp

External links
 MNHN, Paris: specimen

Chicoreus
Gastropods described in 1849